The Mystery Ship was a limited edition motorcycle created by Craig Vetter and released in 1980. Only 10 were built, of which seven were sold. An example is on display at the AMA Motorcycle Museum in Ohio, and another at Barber Vintage Motorsports Museum in Leeds, Al. The one on display at the Barber museum is #9 and is a Turbo charged model.

It was based on a Kawasaki KZ1000 motor and modified chassis, with aftermarket magnesium racing wheels, Yoshimura exhaust, and custom Vetter-designed fairing. Frame modifications took two days labor per vehicle. The $10,000 price, though described as "outrageous" at three times the price of the unmodified KZ1000, was not enough to cover production costs.

The name "Mystery Ship" was derived from the Travel Air Mystery Ship aircraft.

Legacy and influence
The Mystery Ship influenced the fully faired look of modern sportbikes. Cycle World said this of the design:

American Motorcyclist said the Mystery Ship "set the stage for specialty motorcycle companies like Bimota."

References

External links

Mystery Ship
Motorcycles introduced in 1980
Motorcycles of the United States